Elspeth C Ferguson (born 1940) is a female former swimmer who competed for England.

Swimming career
She represented England in the 440 yards freestyle at the 1958 British Empire and Commonwealth Games in Cardiff, Wales.

After switching to contact lenses in 1956 her swimming career took off and swimming for the York Club she won the 1958 ASA National Championship 220 yards freestyle title  and the 1957 and 1958 ASA National Championship 440 yards freestyle titles.

References

1940 births
Living people
English female swimmers
Swimmers at the 1958 British Empire and Commonwealth Games
Commonwealth Games competitors for England